Joseph Cunningham Harker (1855–1927) was a scene painter and theatrical designer in London. Bram Stoker, the author of Dracula, named one of the leading characters (Jonathan Harker) in the novel after him.

Career
Harker was born on 17 October 1855 to Maria (née O’Connor) and William Pierpont Harker, from an Irish theatre family who at the time were performing at the Theatre Royal in Manchester.

Harker played child parts including Fleance in Macbeth, before being apprenticed to his uncle’s trade of scenery painting.  Harker subsequently became a scene painter for a number of major English theatres.

While best known for his work for the  Lyceum alongside Hawes Craven and William Telbin (1846-1931), he was also responsible for the complete scenery for Wagner’s Parsifal at Covent Garden; for A Life of Pleasure performed at the Theatre Royal on Drury Lane in September 1893 and then at the Princes Theatre, Bristol later in that same year, as well as for the musical Chu Chin Chow which ran for a record-breaking five years in the West End from 1916.

He died at the age of 71 on 15 March 1927 in Hampstead in north London.

Studios
In 1905, Harker had a two-storey, open-plan studio constructed to his specifications on Queen’s Row, a narrow street off Walworth Road in London. The painting studio continued to produce scenic designs for the West End and other UK theatres until the 1990s. it was then used to provide work space for freelance London-based artists and set designers. It was used to create David Hockney’s celebrated backdrops for the Glyndebourne opera festival.

Many of its essential fixtures survived intact into the 21st century with many of the original winches and pulleys in place while on the mezzanine floor there were still the large movable frames used to supported Harker’s large  canvas backdrops. These were still being used by artists such Sadeysa Greenaway-Bailey to create artworks.

Despite the building being Grade II listed in 1989,  as an important and rare surviving example of a theatrical scene-painting workshop, the Southwark Council in early 2017 granted permission for the studios to be redeveloped into six luxury flats and an office unit. Prior to this decision the ground floor had been occupied by the trade counter for Flints Theatrical Chandlers, which sold paints, brushes and all of the other material required for the scenic arts.
The artists who had been using in the building hadn’t realised that the redevelopment was happening until the planning application had already been granted. In response a petition which gained more than 4,000 signatures was organized in 2017 requesting that the council change its decision.

Personal life
He married Sarah Elizabeth Hall, (1856–1927). Their son Gordon Harker, who was born in 1885 became  a theatre and film character actor.

Joseph and Sarah’s great-granddaughter Polly Adams was an actress, while two of their great-great-granddaughters, Susannah Harker and Caroline Harker, also became English actresses.

In popular culture
During the period that Harker was employed at the Lyceum Theatre it was managed by Bram Stoker, the author of Dracula. In that book, one of the leading characters (called Jonathan Harker) is named after him.

Harker was an enigmatic secondary character in Joseph O'Connor’s 2019 novel Shadowplay. In the novel Harker was a young woman who had disguised herself as a man in order to obtain the position of scene painter at the Lyceum Theatre.

References

Further reading

</ref>

External links
At Joseph Harker’s Paint Studios.
Ford Madox Brown and Sir Henry Irving's Production of King Lear at the Lyceum Theatre in 1892.
Joseph Harker. Lists many of the plays in which Harker’s set designs were used.
Set design by Joseph Harker for A Life of Pleasure, Theatre Royal Drury Lane, 1893.

1855 births
1927 deaths
British scenic designers
Joseph